Villagers is the fourteenth studio album by experimental rock composer Zoogz Rift, released in 1992 by Musical Tragedies.

Track listing

Personnel 
Adapted from the Villagers liner notes.
 Zoogz Rift – lead vocals, guitar, congas, mridanga, cymbal, production

Musicians
 Tom Brown – drums, additional vocals
 Richie Hass – marimba, vibraphone, drums, additional vocals
 Willie Lapin – bass guitar, additional vocals
 Joe Newman – guitar, additional vocals

Production and additional personnel
 Arthur Barrow – engineering
 Scott Gordon – engineering

Release history

References

External links 
 Villagers at iTunes
 Villagers at Discogs (list of releases)

1992 albums
Zoogz Rift albums